George Brown was an American labor union leader. At one time, he was the president of the International Alliance of Theatrical Stage Employees. 
In 1943, he was tried and convicted with co-conspirator Willie Bioff, of extortion of $1 million from Hollywood film studio producers after threatening them with labor strikes on behalf of the Chicago Outfit.

References

American trade union leaders
American trade union officials convicted of crimes
International Alliance of Theatrical Stage Employees
Year of death missing